Félix Joan Crisanto Velásquez (born 9 September 1990) is a Honduran professional footballer who plays as a right-back for Marathón and the Honduras national team.

Club career

Victoria
Crisanto made his professional debut with C.D. Victoria at the age of 18 in a 2–1 away defeat against C.D. Olimpia on 4 October 2008.

Motagua
On 20 June 2015, Crisanto joined F.C. Motagua. During the 2016–17 season, he won both the Apertura and Clausura championships.

Lobos BUAP
On 31 July 2018, he joined Liga MX club Lobos BUAP on a season-long loan. He made his league debut in a 2–1 loss against C.F. Monterrey the following 22 August.

Olimpia
In August 2021, Crisanto joined C.D. Olimpia. He scored in his debut against Real Sociedad on 8 August.

International career
Crisanto made his debut for the national team in a 5–0 victory against Belize on 2 November 2016. On 29 June 2017, he was named to the 23 man squad for the 2017 CONCACAF Gold Cup. On 6 June 2019, he was named to the 23 man squad for the 2019 Gold Cup.

Honours
Motagua
Liga Nacional: 2016–17 Apertura, 2016–17 Clausura
Honduran Supercup: 2017

Personal life
Crisanto's cousin, Wilmer, is also a footballer. He currently plays with C.D. Marathón.

References

External links
 
 

1990 births
Living people
People from Gracias a Dios Department
Honduran footballers
Honduran expatriate footballers
Honduras international footballers
Association football defenders
C.D. Victoria players
F.C. Motagua players
Lobos BUAP footballers
C.D. Olimpia players
Liga Nacional de Fútbol Profesional de Honduras players
Liga MX players
2017 Copa Centroamericana players
2017 CONCACAF Gold Cup players
2019 CONCACAF Gold Cup players
2021 CONCACAF Gold Cup players
Expatriate footballers in Mexico
Honduran expatriate sportspeople in Mexico
Copa Centroamericana-winning players